The 2021–22 NCAA Division I men's ice hockey season began on October 2, 2021 and concluded with the NCAA championship on April 9, 2022. This was the 74th season in which an NCAA ice hockey championship was held, and was US college hockey's 128th year overall.

Conference realignment and program suspensions
Seven schools that had been members of the men's WCHA made a joint decision to leave and reestablish the CCHA, whose original version had last played in the 2012–13 season. They were joined by St. Thomas, who were raising their athletic programs from Division III. Of the remaining three WCHA men's teams, Alaska would continue as an independent program, Alaska Anchorage would suspend operations until fundraising efforts could determine the future of the team and Alabama–Huntsville would suspend operations until they could secure placement within a conference.

On May 26, Robert Morris University announced the termination of both their men's and women's ice hockey teams. The news came as a shock to most, both within and outside the program, and immediately led to fundraising efforts to secure the return of both teams. Despite collecting more than $1 million in donations in under 3 months, the university declared in early August that the team would not be able to participate in the 2021–22 season and would look to return in 2022–23. RMU would announce on December 17, 2021 that both men's and women's teams would resume play in 2023–24.

On August 31, Alaska Anchorage announced that the $3 million fundraising goal had been reached and the team would return for the 2022–23 season.

Membership changes

Polls

Regular season

Season tournaments

Standings

PairWise Rankings
The PairWise Rankings (PWR) are a statistical tool designed to approximate the process by which the NCAA selection committee decides which teams get at-large bids to the 16-team NCAA tournament. Although the NCAA selection committee does not use the PWR as presented by USCHO, the PWR has been accurate in predicting which teams will make the tournament field.
	
For Division I men, all teams are included in comparisons starting in the 2013–14 season (formerly, only teams with a Ratings Percentage Index of .500 or above, or teams under consideration, were included). The PWR method compares each team with every other such team, with the winner of each “comparison” earning one PWR point. After all comparisons are made, the points are totaled up and rankings listed accordingly.
	
With 59 Division I men's teams, the greatest number of PWR points any team could earn is 58, winning the comparison with every other team. Meanwhile, a team that lost all of its comparisons would have no PWR points.

Teams are then ranked by PWR point total, with ties broken by the teams’ RPI ratings, which starting in 2013-14 is weighted for home and road games and includes a quality wins bonus (QWB) for beating teams in the top 20 of the RPI (it also is weighted for home and road).
	
When it comes to comparing teams, the PWR uses three criteria which are combined to make a comparison: RPI, record against common opponents and head-to-head competition. Starting in 2013–14, the comparison of record against teams under consideration was dropped because all teams are now under comparison.

Player stats

Scoring leaders

Leading goaltenders
The following goaltenders lead the NCAA in goals against average, minimum 1/3 of team's minutes played.

GP = Games played; Min = Minutes played; W = Wins; L = Losses; T = Ties; GA = Goals against; SO = Shutouts; SV% = Save percentage; GAA = Goals against average

Tournament bracket 

* denotes overtime period

Awards

NCAA

Atlantic Hockey

Big Ten

CCHA

ECAC Hockey

Hockey East

NCHC

See also
 2021–22 NCAA Division II men's ice hockey season
 2021–22 NCAA Division III men's ice hockey season

References

 
NCAA